Gino Gerhardi (born 1 October 1988) is a German bobsledder who has competed since 2006.

References

1988 births
Living people
German male bobsledders